Fredrik Paulsson is a Swedish violinist and violist. In 1990, he was the winner of Unga Solister, a music competition for young musicians which is held annually in Helsingborg. The same year he founded the Yggdrasil Quartet, which won awards including the Worshipful Company of Musicians' Award at the 1994 London International String Quartet Competition in 1994, and the Melbourne International Chamber Music Competition. Paulsson currently works as a solo violinist, touring and performing at international music festivals. He is also a member of the Chamber Orchestra of Europe.

References

Swedish classical violists
Swedish violinists
Male violinists
Living people
21st-century violinists
21st-century Swedish male musicians
Year of birth missing (living people)
21st-century violists